A.O. Loutraki Football Club is a Greek football club, based in Loutraki, Corinthia.

The club was founded in 1970. They will play in Football League 2 for the season 2014–15.

Players

Current squad

Staff

Honors

Domestic Titles and honors
 Corinthia FCA Champions: 4
 1990–91, 2009–10, 2012–13, 2013–14
 Corinthia FCA Cup Winners: 2 '
 1974–75, 2012–13

External links
http://www.aoloutraki.gr

Association football clubs established in 1970
1970 establishments in Greece

Gamma Ethniki clubs